Wepuskow Sahgaiechan 165D is an Indian reserve of the Canoe Lake Cree First Nation in Saskatchewan. It is 85 kilometres north of Meadow Lake, and on the west shore of Keeley Lake.

References

Indian reserves in Saskatchewan
Division No. 18, Saskatchewan